

Events calendar

External links

+3